Jjathus Illimski "Jake" Allen (born January 19, 1985) is a former American football wide receiver. He was signed by the Green Bay Packers of the National Football League as an undrafted free agent in 2008. He played college football at Mississippi College. He also played for the Cleveland Browns.

Professional career

Green Bay Packers
Allen was signed by the Green Bay Packers as an undrafted free agent in 2008. He spent the 2008 season on the team's practice squad, and was signed to a future contract at the end of the season. On October 27, 2009 Allen was signed from the practice squad to the active roster after wide receiver Brett Swain was placed on injured reserve. He was waived on November 18.

Cleveland Browns
Allen was claimed off waivers by the Cleveland Browns on November 18, 2009.  He was listed as inactive for each of the remaining games of the 2009 season.  At the end of training camp in 2010, Allen was released on September 3, 2010.

Calgary Stampeders
Allen was signed by the Calgary Stampeders on May 31, 2011.

Georgia Force
Allen was assigned to the Georgia Force during the 2012 season.

References

External links
Calgary Stampeders bio
Green Bay Packers bio

1985 births
Living people
People from Laurel, Mississippi
Players of American football from Mississippi
American football wide receivers
Canadian football wide receivers
Players of Canadian football from Mississippi
Mississippi College Choctaws football players
Green Bay Packers players
Cleveland Browns players
Calgary Stampeders players
Georgia Force players